The Niederwaldsee is a lake in Bensheim. Bensheim is a town in the Bergstraße district in southern Hesse, Germany.

References
http://bensheim-bilder.de/Zwingenberg/pages/Niederwaldsee.htm
 :de:Fehlheim

Lakes of Hesse
Bergstraße (district)